Season Salad (Persian: Salad-e fasl) is a 2005 film by the Iranian director Fereydoun Jeyrani. Jeyrani also wrote the script of the film which was lensed by Hossein Maleki. It starred Leila Hatami, Khosro Shakibai	and Mohamad Reza Sharifinia in the principal roles. Shakibai was awarded a Crystal Simorgh for his performance in the film

References

Iranian crime films
2005 films
Films directed by Fereydoun Jeyrani
Iranian romantic drama films